Huw Warren is a Welsh jazz pianist and composer whose work crosses several genres. He is known as co-leader and founder of the jazz quartet Perfect Houseplants.

Career
Huw Warren was the co-leader and founder of the jazz quartet Perfect Houseplants, with Mark Lockheart, Dudley Phillips, and Martin France. Perfect Houseplants have recorded five albums for various labels (including the Scottish label Linn) and produced collaborative projects with early music artists such as Andrew Manze, Pamela Thorby, and the Orlando Consort. Warren has had a long and continuing collaboration with English singer June Tabor as her arranger and musical director. To date, they have recorded 10 albums, have toured worldwide, and produced large scale projects with the Creative Jazz orchestra and the LPO Renga ensemble. Warren and Tabor were featured in Phillip King's Freedom Highway film and the Daughter's of Albion project recorded in 2009 by BBC Four.

Between 1997 and 2005, Warren worked closely with UK jazz label Babel, who released five albums of his music.

Warren arranged and produced a Welsh Hymn Project in 2004, Duw A Wyr (God only Knows) with singer Lleuwen Steffan, which received media exposure on radio and TV in Wales, including a S4C documentary about the making of the album. He has also worked extensively with partner Maria Lamburn, co-producing 3 albums with her and setting up Maizeh Music.

As the trio Quercus (with June Tabor and Iain Ballamy) Warren has recorded 2 albums for ECM including co producing with the legendary
Manfred Eicher Quercus was released in 2013 and won the German Critics Album of the Year award. "Nightfall" was released in 2017.

In 2018 Warren released a solo piano album Nocturnes and Visions on the Maizeh Music label.

Recent collaborations with international musicians such as Mark Feldman, Maria Pia de Vito, Peter Herbert, Joanna MacGregor, Theo Bleckmann, Pamela Thorby, and Erik Truffaz have brought Warren's music to a wider audience. His project Dialektos with Italian singer Maria Pia de Vito has resulted in 2 recordings (Dialektos and O Pata Pata) and collaborations/performances with musicians such as Gabriele Mirabassi, Ralph Towner, and RA Ramamani.

In 2019, Warren released 2 albums for the Italian label CAM Jazzincluding a new trio album "Everything in Between" with Dudley Phillips and Zoot Warren, and a live duo "New Day" with saxophonist Mark Lockheart

Warren has performed and recorded with many of the UK's finest jazz musicians, including Kenny Wheeler, Loose Tubes, Steve Arguelles, Julian Arguelles, Billy Jenkins, John Parricelli, John Etheridge, Christine Tobin, Tim Garland, Scott Stroman, Antonio Forcione, and Brian Abrahams' District Six.

Warren has also worked with Billy Bragg, Elvis Costello, Eddi Reader, Echobelly, Christine Collister, and the Audio Bullys.

Warren has also recorded film scores for Colin Towns, Stephen Warbeck and Mike Gibbs.

Recent projects have also seen Warren working with artists from a number of different fields including:
 Brace (2009) with Choreographer Chloe Loftus
 Coloured Gloves (2009) with artist Catrin Williams
 ACES Residency, Aberdeen (2011) with sculptor Helen Dennerly, writer Esther Woolfson, and artists Dalziel and Scullion
 Closure (2012) documenting a rural Welsh community with photographer David Woodfall and video artist Greg Byatt

Education
Warren has worked as a piano and composition teacher in the Jazz departments at Royal Academy of Music, Guildhall School of Music and Drama, London, and led many workshops and specialist music education programs. He is currently visiting professor of Jazz Piano at the Royal Welsh College of Music & Drama in Cardiff, Head of Jazz Ensembles at Cardiff University. Piano tutor at the Guildhall School of Music and Drama summer school, and faculty member at JIMS in Salzburg. He has also written and arranged the ABRSM jazz syllabus.

Commissions

1997: Swing Fun/Yokate commissioned by the ABRSM for their Jazz Piano exam syllabus. (solo piano)

1997: Caterpillar commissioned by Curiad, for the school's songbook Cantabile – contemporary songs by living Welsh composers. (voice and piano)

1998: Riot commissioned by Piano Circus with funds from the Arts Council of England. (6 pianos)

1998: A Quiet Eye new arrangements and compositions for June Tabor and a large ensemble commissioned by the Creative Jazz Orchestra with funds from the National Lottery. (voice, piano, viola, 5 brass, 3 reeds)

1998, Nov: Steamboat Bill Jnr new score for classic Buster Keaton movie commissioned by Birmingham Jazz for performance at Birmingham International Film and TV Festival (guitar, piano, saxophone, bass, percussion)

1999, Mar: Take the Fire score for new adaptation of Jean Cocteau monologues at the Lyric Theatre, Hammersmith. Performed by actress Amanda Harris and commissioned by TOYE productions. (solo piano)

1999, Nov: New Folk Songs suite of pieces for contemporary Jazz ensemble, based on traditional music from East Anglia, commissioned by Andrew Milne award/Eastern Arts for performances by Perfect Houseplants.

1999: Left a Bit new music for piano and two percussionists/electronics commissioned by Eccentric Management with funds from the Arts Council of England for performance in Berlin and England.

2000: Lullaby, Exit, Bear for 13 piece ensemble commissioned by RSC millennium project.

2001: Shout/Greens commissioned by the ABRSM for the Jazz Horns syllabus

2001: Still Hearing You arrangement for the Palladium ensemble as an encore piece (recorder, violin, viola da gamba, and theorbo)

2002: I am the Song commissioned by Tauntons Sixth form college choir (Southampton), and performed at the National Festival of Music for Youth at the Royal Festival Hall.

2003: Railway Mania commissioned by the Scottish Chamber Orchestra, for performance in October 2004. (children's choir and mixed ensemble)

2004: Tangled. New piece for Tango Siempre, commissioned by Corsham Music Festival, Wiltshire. (violin, accordion, double bass, piano)

2005: Soldier, Shepherd, Sailor. June Tabor and The LPO Renga Ensemble.

2005: New Welsh Stories. Big Band suite, commissioned by Cerdd William Mathias, with funds made available from the PRS Foundation.

2006: This is Now!. Multi-media work for Orchestra Helclecs, featuring John Parricelli, Lleuwen Steffan and Nobsta Nuts. Funded by the Arts Council of Wales 'Creative Wales' Award.

2006: Strung Out. Double violin concerto, Welsh Chamber Orchestra and Beaumaris Festival/PRSF.

2006: In the Beginning/Slippery. Welsh Jazz Composers Orchestra/ACW.

2006: Gower Boy (film with Gee Vaucher)

Vortex Jazz/Babel label

2007: Solo piano pieces

KPM/Galapogos

2007: Open. Piano piece for Elena Riu and Boosey & Hawkes. This piece was included in the 2013/2014 ABRSM Grade 6 syllabus.

2008: Brace. Dance collaboration with Choreographer Chloe Loftus (prsf new steps in music)

2009: Hermeto... Jazz/Art Project. Collaboration with artist Catrin Williams at Galeri Caernarfon.

2010: The Brecon Project. Collaboration with Erik Truffaz, Sura Susso, Paula Gardiner. and Simon Thorne. Performed at Brecon Jazz, 2010.

2010: Tilt. Commissioned by classical jazz mixed ensemble "New Perspectives". First performance at Leasowes Bank Arts Festival, July 2011

2011: Gladrags. Big band/large jazz ensemble, commissioned by Farnham Festival 2011.

Discography
Nocturnes and Visions Maizeh Music 2018 Solo Piano

'Nightfall (ECM Records) Quercus 2017 (trio including June Tabor and Iain Ballamy)Core/coracao Maria Pia de Vito with special guest Chico BuarqueQuercus (ECM Records) Quercus 2013O Pata Pata (Maria Pia de Vito/Ralph Towner) 2011Ashore (June Tabor) 2011Hermeto + 2009 (Basho)Dialektos – Maria Pia de Vito and Huw Warren 2008 (Parco Della Musica)Everything We Love and More – Huw Warren and Peter Herbert 2006 (Babel)Brillanza – Waltraud Koettler, Huw Warren, Peter Herbert 2007 (Extraplatte)Duw a Wyr – Huw Warren and Lleuwen Steffan – 2005 (Sain/Babel)100's of Things a Boy Can Make – with Mark Feldman 2003 (Babel)Infinite Riches in a Little Room – solo piano 2001 (Babel)A Barrel Organ Far from Home – mixed ensemble1997 (Babel)Perfect Houseplants – Perfect Houseplants AH UM (1992)Clec – Perfect Houseplants −1994 (EFZ)Snap Clatter – Perfect Houseplants 1997 (Linn)New Folk Songs – Perfect Houseplants 2000 (Linn)Extempore – Perfect Houseplants+The Orlando Consort 1999 (Linn)Extempore 2 – Perfect Houseplants+The Orlando Consort 2002 (Harmonia Mundi USA)Pulse -Huw Warren/Peter Whyman/Peter Fairclough 2004 (FMR)Murmur – Madalena 2005 (Babel)A Quiet Eye – June Tabor 2000 (topic)An Echo of Hooves – June Tabor 2004 (topic)Busy Listening -Steve Arguelles Quintet– 1998 (Babel)East Meets West – Billy Jenkins' Voice of God Collective+Fun Horns of Berlin 1998 (Babel)

Radio

Warren did live broadcasts for Radio 3, including duos with Peter Herbert and John Parricelli. Warren performed in another live special, Late Junction, with June Tabor, as well as the Radio 3 60th anniversary concert with Perfect Houseplants. Other live performances include: The Radio Wales Arts Show special interview with Nichola Heywood Thomas, Late Junction 10th anniversary live special (2010), and Hermeto+ live for Jazz on 3 (2010) with Dudley Phillips, Iain Ballamy, Maria Pia de Vito, and Martin France.

TV

Warren appeared in the BBC4 Sessions with June Tabor, and later with Jools Holland in the S4C Documentary (Sioe Celf) about the making of Duw y Wyr'' with Lleuwen Steffan. Warren also appeared in the Brecon Jazz Festival (2006), a BBC4 documentary "Jazz Pianists", as well as a S4C 25th anniversary program about Brecon Jazz in 2007.

References

External links
 Huw Warren Official site
 Huw Warren biography from BBC Wales

Living people
Alumni of Goldsmiths, University of London
Alumni of the Guildhall School of Music and Drama
British jazz pianists
Welsh jazz pianists
1962 births
21st-century pianists